Anirudh Kanwar (born 13 March 1994) is an Indian cricketer. He made his List A debut on 1 October 2019, for Chandigarh in the 2019–20 Vijay Hazare Trophy. He made his Twenty20 debut on 14 November 2019, for Chandigarh in the 2019–20 Syed Mushtaq Ali Trophy. He made his first-class debut on 17 December 2019, for Chandigarh in the 2019–20 Ranji Trophy.

References

External links
 

1994 births
Living people
Indian cricketers
Chandigarh cricketers
Place of birth missing (living people)